Ricardo is an unincorporated community in Kern County, California.

It was on the old California State Route 14 before 1970s realignment. The Red Rock Canyon State Park headquarters are near its site.

A post office operated at Ricardo from 1898 to 1907, from 1908 to 1912, and from 1913 to 1917. The town was named by Rudolf Hagen for his son, Richard Hagen.

See also
Red Rock Canyon State Park (California)

References

Populated places in the Mojave Desert
Unincorporated communities in Kern County, California
Unincorporated communities in California